Ernst Fuhrimann (born 28 June 1913, date of death unknown) was a Swiss cyclist. He competed in the team pursuit event at the 1936 Summer Olympics.

References

External links
 

1913 births
Year of death missing
Swiss male cyclists
Olympic cyclists of Switzerland
Cyclists at the 1936 Summer Olympics
Place of birth missing